Jan Haag (born Jan Smith; December 6, 1933) is an American filmmaker, artist and writer who founded the American Film Institute (AFI) Directing Workshop for Women and also gained notability for her needlepoint canvases and poetry.

Early life
Jan Haag (née Smith), born in Marysville, WA, grew up in the Pacific Northwest, graduated from Seattle's Holy Names Academy, and went on to study art and painting at Burnley School for Professional Art. Haag continued her studies at the Art Institute of Chicago, Reed College in Portland, Oregon, The New School for Social Research in New York, University of Washington, Pennsylvania State University, UCLA, and Southwestern University School of Law. Haag also studied painting with Frederick E. Smith, dance with Eleanor King, and singing and tabla with Ali Akbar Khan and Swapan Chaudhuri.

Career
In Seattle, Haag managed poetry readings, an art gallery, and the Shakespeare Workshop for ABC Bookstore. As an actress, she performed in regional theaters during the 1950s and 1960s, and directed plays in Washington, Oregon and California. Haag has exhibited her work in West Coast museums, competitions, and galleries—including the Seattle Art Museum, the Frye Museum, the Otto Seligman Gallery, and the Woessner Gallery.

In Los Angeles, Haag served as Film and Television Director for the John Tracy Clinic, where she directed a series of forty-two films, "Teaching Speech to the Profoundly Deaf," for the Department of Health, Education, and Welfare. In 1971 she joined the staff of the American Film Institute where, as Director of National Production Programs, she administered the nation's largest film granting program, the Independent Filmmaker Program, funded by the National Endowment for the Arts. In 1974, with funding from the Rockefeller Foundation, she founded AFI's Directing Workshop for Women, a program in which accomplished women—such as Joanne Woodward, Lee Grant, Margot Kidder, Ellen Burstyn, Maya Angelou, Karen Arthur, Anne Bancroft, Dyan Cannon, Julie Phillips, Kathleen Nolan, Cicely Tyson, Brianne Murphy, Nessa Hyams, and Randa Haines could develop their directing skills. The DWW became the fountainhead back to which the careers of many women, now directing film and television, can be traced. Haag also served on the boards of many film festivals/programs, including the Bellevue Film Festival, Filmex, the Sundance Institute, and the International Women Filmmakers Symposium.

Between 1975 and 2008, Haag created twenty-three needlepoint canvases, working on some of these simultaneously. One work took ten years to complete. The more complex of these canvases required hundreds, sometimes thousands of hours of application. An accomplished painter and poet familiar with different mediums, Haag writes of the textile art medium: “Compared with the roughhouse immediacy of painting and sculpture, one can cite many a rug, tapestry, piece of stitchery which took a year to make or, at times, a decade. Back and back and back, millennia by millennia, the history and lore of weaving/stitchery recedes as we, at the near end of the time scale, proceed -- cloth, grid arts, fractals and computer -- into the future.”

Haag explains: “Over the years, working on these pieces has become one of my primary ways of understanding both the world and my experience of it. The works… transmit knowledge. Not only the powerful subjective awareness of light and color, but the pleasure associated with study -- in this case, study of music, astronomy, mathematics, travel, archaeology, and the iconographic, mystical and esoteric traditions of many cultures.”

These textile pieces became a life’s work. Through determined experimentation and applying techniques and iconography learned from a lifetime of travel, including treks on foot alone through India, Korea, China, Thailand, Nepal, Russia and Europe, Haag would forever change the perceptions and possibilities of needlepoint.

In 1982, Haag retired from AFI to focus on her art and writing. She has written thousands of poems and given poetry readings in theaters, museums, libraries, galleries, and private salons. A limited edition of "Amanita Caesarea", a legend, with original drawings by Roger Landry, was published by Gallery Plus in Los Angeles. Haag has written stories, novels, plays, film scripts, articles, essays, and a vast journal—the manuscripts of which are on deposit in Special Collections at the Blagg Huey Library of Texas Woman's University in Denton, TX. Haag's travel stories have appeared in four of the prize-winning Traveler's Tales series of books: India, A Woman's World, The Spiritual Gifts of Travel, and Spain. During a 1991 writer's fellowship at the Syvenna Foundation in Texas, Haag wrote a novel Cantalloc. In 1992, during a writer's fellowship at Blue Mountain Center in New York, she completed No Palms, a California/Texas novel centering on water rights, real estate fraud, and murder. After 50 years of research and study, in 2009, Haag published Jocasta, an original play based on the Oedipus myth seen from Jocasta's point of view. Ascesis, a 600-page volume of poetry, was published in 2014.

Personal life
Haag was married for ten years, 1957–68, to John Haag, Professor and Poet-in-Residence at Pennsylvania State University. Haag currently resides within the Seattle metropolitan area.

Selected works
Poetry and Fiction
 
 
 
 
 
 
 
 
 

Nonfiction

References

1933 births
Living people
American textile artists
American poets
American Film Institute
Women textile artists
People from Marysville, Washington